The Naughty Duchess is a 1928 American silent murder mystery, written by novelist Anthony Hope Hawkins based on his 1894 novel The Indiscretion of the Duchess: being a story concerning two ladies, a nobleman, and a necklace.

Cast
Eve Southern as Hortense
H. B. Warner as Duke de St. Maclou
Duncan Renaldo as Armand

References

External links
 
 
 
 

1928 films
Films directed by Tom Terriss
American black-and-white films
1928 drama films
American silent feature films
Tiffany Pictures films
Films based on works by Anthony Hope
American mystery drama films
1920s mystery films
1920s English-language films
1920s American films
Silent American drama films
Silent mystery films